Nemanja Lekanić (born 10 January 1990) is a Bosnian professional footballer who plays as a right midfielder for Bosnian Premier League club Olimpik.

Career
Born in Sarajevo, the capital of SR Bosnia and Herzegovina, back then within SFR Yugoslavia, Lekanić played in Serbia for almost his whole career. Starting at the youth team of Partizan, he later played with Sinđelić Beograd in Serbian League Belgrade, with Dorćol at same level, Zemun in the Serbian First League, then Mladenovac at Serbian League Belgrade, Sloga Kraljevo in the Serbian First League, then second half of the 2013–14 Serbian SuperLiga  season with Sloboda Užice, although he didn't make nay appearances, then with Smederevo 1924 in the Serbian League West, until the summer of 2015 when he joined Mačva Šabac.

His move to Mačva was decisive because he was part of a generation that made the club climb two levels in just two seasons, and also making him debut in the 2017–18 Serbian SuperLiga. However, after the initial stat of the season, Lekanić still in the early stage moved to Sinđelić Beograd, playing in the 2017–18 Serbian First League. He then joined Bosnian club Sloga Gornje Crnjelovo in the summer of 2018, then playing in the First League of RS. In March 2019, he joined Borac Banja Luka, with whom he secured promotion to the 2019–20 Bosnian Premier League.

On 13 January 2020, Lekanić signed a contract with, at the time, First League of FBiH club Olimpik. On 26 May 2020, the 2019–20 First League of FBiH season ended abruptly due to the COVID-19 pandemic in Bosnia and Herzegovina and, by default, Lekanić with Olimpik were crowned league champions and got promoted back to the Bosnian Premier League.

Honours
Mačva Šabac
Serbian First League: 2016–17
Serbian League West: 2015–16

Borac Banja Luka
First League of RS: 2018–19

Olimpik
First League of FBiH: 2019–20

References

External links
Nemanja Lekanić at Sofascore

1990 births
Living people
Footballers from Sarajevo
Serbs of Bosnia and Herzegovina
Association football midfielders
Bosnia and Herzegovina footballers
FK Sinđelić Beograd players
FK Dorćol players
FK Zemun players
OFK Mladenovac players
FK Sloga Kraljevo players
FK Sloboda Užice players
FK Smederevo players
FK Mačva Šabac players
FK Borac Banja Luka players
FK Olimpik players
Serbian First League players
Serbian SuperLiga players
First League of the Republika Srpska players
First League of the Federation of Bosnia and Herzegovina players